Alin Jaq (also Romanized as Alīn Jaq; also known as Alenjaq) is a village in Dizajrud-e Sharqi Rural District, Qaleh Chay District, Ajab Shir County, East Azerbaijan Province, Iran. At the 2006 census, its population was 508, in 123 families.

References 

Populated places in Ajab Shir County